The national headquarters for Park Seed Company, Jackson & Perkins, and Wayside Gardens is located in Greenwood, South Carolina. The trial gardens previously featured on the grounds closed in 2013 as the company shifted to a fully eCommerce based retail platform. 

Park Seed Company's annual Flower Day was a day each year when the company’s professional horticulturists give guided tours of the gardens. In 1967, Flower Day gave rise to the South Carolina Festival of Flowers, which through the years has become a three-week-long celebration encompassing garden tours, art and photography competitions, a triathlon, and numerous other cultural and recreational activities.

Park Seed Trial Garden
The Park Seed Trial Garden provided a living laboratory where Park Seed Company’s research horticulturists compared the quality of industry standard plants with new varieties being offered by plant developers. Each year, Park Seed Company conducted trials on more than 2,000 varieties, all hand planted and tended. Trials run January through August for warm season annuals, October through February for cool season annuals, and all year long for permanent plantings of perennials. Park Seed’s trial garden is part of the prestigious All-America Selections (AAS) program. Park Seed Company has been very active with AAS since the mid-1950s. Park Seed staff horticultural experts frequently serve as AAS judges, and five Park Seed executives have served as AAS president. The trial gardens and on-site retail store closed in 2013.

Park Seed Garden Gallery
This gallery of garden photographs provides a sense of the range and beauty of the Park Seed Company Gardens.

See also
List of botanical gardens in the United States

George Watt Park

Park Seed Company

Wayside Gardens

All-America Selections

External links
 www.parkseed.com—Retail Site
 Park Seed Journal—Blog
 www.waysidegardens.com—Retail Site
 Wayside Gardens Voices—Blog
 South Carolina Festival of Flowers

Gardens in South Carolina
Tourist attractions in Greenwood County, South Carolina
Buildings and structures in Greenwood, South Carolina